Kent City is a village in Kent County in the U.S. state of Michigan. The population was 1,262 at the 2020 census.  The village is located within Tyrone Township.

Geography

Major highways
  passes northwest through the southwestern portion of the village.
  runs west–east through the center of the village and briefly runs concurrently with M-37.

Climate
This climatic region is typified by large seasonal temperature differences, with warm to hot (and often humid) summers and cold (sometimes severely cold) winters.  According to the Köppen Climate Classification system, Kent City has a humid continental climate, abbreviated "Dfb" on climate maps.

Education
The village of Kent City is served by Kent City Community Schools, which serves a much larger area including several townships in Kent County and smaller areas extending west into Muskegon County and Ottawa County.
  The district is headquartered in Kent City and includes Kent City High School, Kent City Middle School, and Kent City Elementary School within its boundaries.

The Tyrone Township Branch of the Kent District Library is located in Kent City.

Demographics

2010 census
As of the census of 2010, there were 1,057 people, 373 households, and 268 families living in the village. The racial makeup of the village was 88.8% White, 0.9% African American, 0.3% Native American, 0.2% Asian, 7.7% from other races, and 2.1% from two or more races. Hispanic or Latino of any race were 17.8% of the population.

There were 373 households, of which 43.7% had children under the age of 18 living with them, 49.9% were married couples living together, 14.2% had a female householder with no husband present, 7.8% had a male householder with no wife present, and 28.2% were non-families. 23.6% of all households were made up of individuals, and 7% had someone living alone who was 65 years of age or older. The average household size was 2.83 and the average family size was 3.33.

The median age in the village was 30.6 years. 30.7% of residents were under the age of 18; 9.8% were between the ages of 18 and 24; 28.9% were from 25 to 44; 22.8% were from 45 to 64; and 7.7% were 65 years of age or older. The gender makeup of the village was 48.2% male and 51.8% female.

2000 census
As of the census of 2000, there were 1,061 people, 373 households, and 270 families living in the village. The racial makeup of the village was 94.82% White, 0.28% African American, 0.19% Native American, 3.20% from other races, and 1.51% from two or more races. Hispanic or Latino of any race were 11.88% of the population.

There were 373 households, out of which 46.1% had children under the age of 18 living with them, 50.9% were married couples living together, 15.8% had a female householder with no husband present, and 27.6% were non-families. 23.9% of all households were made up of individuals, and 8.6% had someone living alone who was 65 years of age or older.  The average household size was 2.84 and the average family size was 3.33.

In the village, the population was spread out, with 34.0% under the age of 18, 11.5% from 18 to 24, 29.6% from 25 to 44, 16.2% from 45 to 64, and 8.7% who were 65 years of age or older.  The median age was 28 years. For every 100 females, there were 90.5 males.  For every 100 females age 18 and over, there were 87.2 males.

The median income for a household in the village was $35,341, and the median income for a family was $42,375. Males had a median income of $33,750 versus $24,167 for females. The per capita income for the village was $13,084.  About 11.1% of families and 12.0% of the population were below the poverty line, including 15.0% of those under age 18 and 14.1% of those age 65 or over.

Superfund site
The Kent City Mobile Home Park was listed as a federal Superfund Site. A buried 55-gallon drum containing dry cleaning chemicals contaminated both the surrounding soil and groundwater, including the well servicing the mobile home park. Cleanup efforts began in 1984 and included replacing the contaminated well, removing the drum and the contaminated soil, and ongoing groundwater monitoring. The United States Environmental Protection Agency removed the site's Superfund status in 1995.

References

External links
 Village of Kent City official website

Villages in Kent County, Michigan
Villages in Michigan
Grand Rapids metropolitan area
Superfund sites in Michigan
Populated places established in 1908
1908 establishments in Michigan